Hampole Priory was a priory of Cistercian nuns (Knowles & Hadcock) in Hampole,  South Yorkshire, England.  Its existence was documented in a papal bull of 1146. The nuns were active in the wool trade. Richard Rolle, a mystic author in the 14th century known as the "hermit of Hampole", settled at the priory after several moves and lived there until his death in 1349. It was dissolved in the 16th century.

A cottage now stands on the site of the former priory.

References

Monasteries in South Yorkshire